Frank J. Olivo was alderman of the 13th ward of the City of Chicago.

Early history
Olivo grew up in Chicago; he attended St. Mary Star of the Sea grammar school and Hubbard High School.

Aldermanic career
As Alderman of the 13th ward, Olivo co-founded the Graffeti Removal Program designed to combat crime, and the Real Estate Anti-Solicitation Program to protect the value of homes.
Olivo serves on seven committees: Aviation; Budget and Government Operations; Committees, Rules, and Ethics; Finance; License and Consumer Protection; Traffic Control and Safety, and Zoning.

Olivo was the only alderman to report receiving gifts valued at more than $500 in 2006 on their required annual ethics disclosures. A die-hard White Sox fan, Olivo reported receiving: 68 Sox tickets valued at $2,556 and 22 "package passes" worth $308; 13 Chicago Bulls tickets valued at $1,315; $420 worth of St. Louis Cardinals tickets; $114 worth of Milwaukee Brewers tickets and 26 Chicago Cubs tickets and four package passes valued at $1,751.

Olivo co-sponsored a proposed amendment (PO2007-7206) to the Municipal Code of Chicago prohibiting the sale or possession of live chickens in residential districts in Chicago, which was introduced to the Chicago City Council and referred to the City Council's Committee on Health on September 27, 2007.

In 2008 Olivo was found to be one of seven Chicago aldermen who between them got ten of their children good-paying summer jobs with the Metropolitan Water Reclamation District of Greater Chicago.

Personal life
Alderman Olivo lives in Chicago in the West Lawn community with his wife, Karen and their three children: Frank, Dana, and Anthony.

Professional career
Olivo serves as a member of the Secretary of State's Motor Vehicle Review Board, a paid patronage job on a board that mediates disputes between car dealers and manufacturers.

References

External links
 Chicago City Council bio

Year of birth missing (living people)
Living people
American people of Italian descent
Chicago City Council members
Chicago City Council members appointed by Richard M. Daley